Thira is a crater on Mars. It is located within the larger crater Gusev.

The rim of the crater can be seen in the distance in images taken by Spirit.

References

External links 
 Official Mars Rovers site

Impact craters on Mars
Aeolis quadrangle